The Grand Union Hotel is a historic hotel in Fort Benton, Montana. It was built as a luxury hotel prior to the expansion of the railroads to Helena and Great Falls. Construction began in 1881, and it was completed in 1882; the builders included Frank Coombs, W. G. Jones, and others. An inaugural ball was held in 1882, and the hotel celebrated its 125th year in 2007.

The building was designed by architect Thomas Tweedy in the Victorian style. It has been listed on the National Register of Historic Places since January 2, 1976.

References

Hotel buildings on the National Register of Historic Places in Montana
National Register of Historic Places in Chouteau County, Montana
Victorian architecture in Montana
Hotel buildings completed in 1882
1882 establishments in Montana Territory